The discography of The Weakerthans, a Canadian indie rock band, consists of four studio albums, one live album and concert video, one EP, one single, and eight music videos.

The Weakerthans formed in Winnipeg in 1997 with the lineup of John K. Samson (vocals, guitar), John P. Sutton (bass guitar), and Jason Tait (drums). Their debut album Fallow was released in Canada in December of that year through G7 Welcoming Committee Records, a label founded by Samson's former bandmates in Propagandhi, with a United States release following in 1999 through Sub City Records. Stephen Carroll performed on the album as a guest musician, and soon joined the band as second guitarist. Left and Leaving was released in July 2000, through G7 Welcoming Committee in Canada and Sub City in the United States. A single for "Watermark" followed in January 2001.

The band signed to Epitaph Records and released Reconstruction Site in 2003. It was their first album to chart, reaching no. 28 on Billboard's Independent Albums. Sutton left the band in 2004 and was replaced by Greg Smith. The new lineup released Reunion Tour in September 2007 through Epitaph and its subsidiary label ANTI-. It became their highest-charting album, reaching no. 181 on the Billboard 200. The iTunes-exclusive Live Session EP was released in 2009, with a full live album and concert video, Live at the Burton Cummings Theatre, following in March 2010.

The Weakerthans also performed on Jim Bryson's 2010 album The Falcon Lake Incident, credited to Jim Bryson and The Weakerthans. Carroll, Smith, and Tait also performed on Greg Graffin's 2006 album Cold as the Clay.

Studio albums

Live albums

EPs

Singles

Video albums

Music videos

Other appearances 
The following Weakerthans songs were released on compilation albums. This is not an exhaustive list; songs that were first released on the band's albums and singles are not included.

References 

 
 
Discographies of Canadian artists
Rock music group discographies